Saint-Malo is a municipality in Quebec, Canada, on the Canada–United States border. Saint-Malo has the highest elevation of any municipality in Quebec. At , local residents live in an environment of forests, farms, and waterways that supply their livelihood.

Every September, Saint-Malo holds a Harvest Festival that includes a "country" mass. A popular point of interest is La Montagnaise, a -tall observation tower built in 1995, that offers panoramic views of the countryside.

History
The parish of Saint-Malo was established in 1863 by Canadiens and was incorporated as a municipality in 1910. The town's name evokes Saint-Malo, France— the hometown in Brittany of Jacques Cartier, the first European explorer to describe and map modern Quebec and to name his discoveries as "Canada".

Demographics

Population
Population trend:

ADJ = adjusted figures due to boundary changes between census years

Sister City and Village
Saint-Malo, France
St. Malo, Manitoba, Manitoba

Notable People

Michel Petit, NHL ice hockey player.

References

Municipalities in Quebec
Incorporated places in Estrie
Coaticook Regional County Municipality